The Qatari-Bahraini War, also known as the Qatari War of Independence, was an armed conflict that took place between 1867 and 1868 in the Persian Gulf. The conflict pitted Bahrain and Abu Dhabi against Qatar. The conflict was the most flagrant violation of the 1835 maritime truce, requiring British intervention. The two emirates agreed to a truce, mediated by the United Kingdom, which led to Britain recognizing the Al-Thani family of Qatar as the semi-independent ruler of Qatar. The conflict resulted in wide-scale destruction in both emirates.

Background
The 1835 maritime truce was a truce agreed between individual Arab emirates such as Abu Dhabi, Sharjah, the rest of the Trucial States as well as Bahrain and Oman. The truce was supervised by the British Royal Navy (notably the Bombay Marine). In order to enforce a pre-existing peace treaty (the General Maritime Treaty of 1820), the Bombay Marine deployed squadrons to the Arabian Gulf, based in Qeshm Island. The treaty prohibited piracy in the Persian Gulf but it did not outlaw maritime warfare, as a result, the British acted differently towards pirates who attacked ships hoisting a British flag (these pirates were deported to Bombay to be tried) and those who attacked other parties' ships (the pirates would then be handed over to the country in question). In 1835, a loose coalition of Abu Dhabi, Ajman, Sharjah and Ras al-Khaimah ships began to harass and plunder vessels belonging to Oman. Britain intervened when two British flagged ships were plundered by Abu Dhabi. The Bombay Marine was dispatched and on 16 April 1835, a decisive victory for the British was won, leaving much of the Abu Dhabi vessels in ruins.

The 1835 truce initially started as a British-sponsored six-month truce during the pearling season, and was successful. It was renewed willingly by the Sheikhs for another eight months. The truce would then be renewed annually until 1843 when Britain proposed a 10-year truce, which was agreed by the Sheikhs. During the peace, the Arab emirates of the Arabian Gulf experienced an economic boom, hence why, in 1853, when Britain proposed a permanent peace, the Trucial States agreed.

Chronology
In 1860s, the relations between Qatar and Bahrain deteriorated with a series of small disputes. Hostilities emerged when, in 1867, Bahrain arrested a Qatari Bedouin in the Qatari mainland and deported him to Bahrain. In response, the Qataris, led by the Al-Thani tribe, attacked and defeated the Bahraini army that was based on the peninsula, effectively expelling them. These tensions led Bahrain, allied with Abu Dhabi, to attack Qatar.

The conflict failed to pacify and resulted in an escalation between the two parties in the following year. In October 1867, the Bahraini Sheikh Mohammed al Khalifa, sent his brother, Ali bin Khalifa, with a force of 500 men in 24 boats to attack Qatar (Mostly in the area now known as Zekreet). He was joined by a force of 200 men under Ahmed al Khalifa. Additionally, Bahrain's ally Abu Dhabi sent 2,000 troops in 70 boats. The attack on Qatar led to the sacking of Bida (Doha) and Wakrah. A British record later stated "that the towns of Doha and Wakrah were, at the end of 1867 temporarily blotted out of existence, the houses being dismantled and the inhabitants deported". A Qatari counterattack followed the next year, resulting in the destruction of most of the Bahraini naval vessels deployed. The 1868 attack resulted in some 1,000 individuals killed and 60 ships destroyed.

Anglo-Bahraini agreement of 1868

Prior to 1867, the British recognized Qatar as a Bahraini dependency. Lieutenant Colonel Lewis Pelly, the British Resident in Bahrain, issued an ultimatum to the Bahraini Hakim, accusing him of violating the maritime law and demanding reparations of 10,000 Iranian Tomans. On 6 September 1868, Ali al Khalifa effectively took control of Bahrain as hakim after Colonel Pelly appointed him,  after his brother Mohammed fled.

The dispute led to the British recognizing the Al Thani for the first time as a semi-independent political unit in Qatar. Lewis Pelly visited Qatar, met the sheikhs and signed the Treaty of 1868 with Muhammad Al Thani. The treaty ended the maritime warfare. As part of the treaty's conditions, Bahrain was forced to renounce claims of sovereignty on Qatari soil as well as accept several British penalties, most of which were financial.

See also
List of conflicts in the Near East

References

Conflicts in 1868
1867 in Bahrain
1868 in Bahrain
1867 in Qatar
1868 in Qatar
Wars involving Qatar
Wars involving Bahrain
War
Bahrain–United Arab Emirates relations
Qatar–United Arab Emirates relations
1860s in Asia